Hellboy: Dogs of the Night is a 2000 American video game for the PC, developed by Cryo Studios. It was ported to the PlayStation as Hellboy: Asylum Seeker, developed by Hoplite Research and released in 2003. The Hellboy game is based on Dark Horse Comics' science fiction comic book series Hellboy, written and drawn by Mike Mignola.

Reception
The Windows  version has a score of 11.50% at GameRankings. Jason Babler of the Official U.S. PlayStation Magazine (October 2003) rated the game 0.5 out of 5, saying, "God help me—I didn't think it could ever be this bad."

References

External links 

2000 video games
Action video games
Cryo Interactive games
Hellboy
PlayStation (console) games
Single-player video games
Video games about demons
Video games based on Dark Horse Comics
Video games developed in the United States
Video games set in psychiatric hospitals
Windows games